ZeBarney Thorne Phillips (May 1, 1875 – May 1942) was an Episcopal clergyman who served as Chaplain of the Senate (1927–1942).

Early years 
ZeBarney Thorne Phillips was born in Springfield, Ohio, May 1, 1875, the son of ZeBarney and Sallie Essex Sharp Phillips.  The elder Phillips died when his son was four years old.  The younger Phillips was educated at Wittenberg College, Springfield, Ohio.  For the next twelve years, his profession was church organist. Then, he became a student at the General Theological Seminary of New York City, graduating in 1899.

Ministry 
On July 9, 1899, he was ordained a deacon of the Episcopal church.  Following work at St. Luke's church, Cincinnati, he took charge of St. Mary's church at Hillsboro, Ohio (1899).  On May 1, 1900, he was ordained to the priesthood and became rector of St. Mary's church, where he remained until June of the following year.  Thereafter, he served these churches in succession: the Church of Our Saviour, Mount Auburn, Cincinnati, Ohio (1900–1903) and Trinity church, Chicago (1903–1909).  Following two years of study in Oxford, England and a year of lecturing in New York, he was called to become the rector of St. Peter's Church, St. Louis, Missouri.

He became rector of the Church of the Epiphany in Washington, D.C. (1924–1942). On December 5, 1927, he was elected Chaplain of the Senate, a post he filled until his death on May 10, 1942.

He was elected Dean of the Washington National Cathedral in 1941; he served until his sudden death in May 1942 (from an erroneously filled prescription).  During his short tenure as dean, Phillips' professional music training as an organist led directly to the founding of the Cathedral Choral Society, the resident symphonic chorus of the Cathedral, whose inaugural concert on the day of Dean Phillips’s funeral in May 1942 became his requiem.

Personal life 
On September 4, 1906, Phillips married Mrs. Sallie Hews Winston, daughter of Edson Lawrence Hews, of New Orleans, Louisiana; their children were Sallie Hews and Faith Phillips.

References

External links

1875 births
1942 deaths
Chaplains of the United States Senate
People from Springfield, Ohio
20th-century American Episcopalians
Wittenberg University alumni
General Theological Seminary alumni